Senator Lees may refer to:

Brian Lees (born 1953), Massachusetts State Senate
Robert Lees (politician) (1842–1908), Wisconsin State Senate